AIC 23 (also known as Alice in Chains Twenty-Three) is a 2013 mockumentary by American rock band Alice in Chains to promote their fifth studio album, The Devil Put Dinosaurs Here. The screenplay was co-written by guitarist/vocalist Jerry Cantrell, director Peter Darley Miller, and actor W. Earl Brown. The video premiered on Funny or Die on April 3, 2013. The title is a spoof of Pearl Jam's documentary Pearl Jam Twenty (2011).

Snippets of songs from The Devil Put Dinosaurs Here are featured in the film, such as the first two singles, "Hollow" and "Stone", and two songs that had not been made available before the album was released: "Voices" and "Phantom Limb".

Synopsis
AIC 23 follows film studies professor Alan Poole McLard on his journey to make a documentary about Alice in Chains. McLard interviews other musicians who have been influenced by the band. Among them are country singer Donnie "Skeeter" Dollarhide Jr. (played by guitarist/vocalist Jerry Cantrell), reggae singer Nesta Cleveland (played by vocalist William DuVall), black metal musician Unta Gleeben Glabben Globben Globin (played by bassist Mike Inez), and hipster blogger Stanley Eisen (played by drummer Sean Kinney).

Cast
 W. Earl Brown as Alan Poole McLard
 Sean Kinney as Stanley Eisen
 William DuVall as Nesta Cleveland
 Mike Inez as Unta Gleeben Glabben Globben Globin
 Jerry Cantrell as Donnie "Skeeter" Dollarhide Jr.
 Kim Thayil as himself
 Lars Ulrich as himself
 Robert Trujillo as himself
 Nancy Wilson as herself
 Ann Wilson as herself
 Mike McCready as himself
 Bill Kelliher as himself
 Duff McKagan as himself
 Brent Hinds as himself

Production
Alice in Chains' guitarist and vocalist Jerry Cantrell told Loudwire that the idea for AIC 23 came out of five or six conference calls with the band wondering what they would do to promote their new album, The Devil Put Dinosaurs Here. So the members made up their characters and had a loose idea of what they wanted to do, similar to what they did on The Nona Tapes (1995). The band brought up director Peter Darley Miller and actor W. Earl Brown, who is also a friend of Cantrell. Alice in Chains' co-lead vocalist William DuVall stated that the band would rather do anything than a run-of-the-mill promo video, and that's why they decided to do this video.

The script was co-written by Jerry Cantrell and W. Earl Brown. Cantrell revealed that his character is a little bit his dad. Sean Kinney improvised the "cuff" lines and "I was in a band back in the day".

The prosthetic makeup was made by Oscar-winning make-up artist Matthew W. Mungle, who also worked on Edward Scissorhands (1990), Bram Stoker's Dracula (1992) and Schindler's List (1993).

Release
AIC 23 premiered on Funny or Die on April 3, 2013, and was uploaded to Alice in Chains' official YouTube channel two days later.

References

External links
 
 Alice in Chains: AIC 23 on YouTube
 Alice in Chains: AIC 23 on Funny or Die

Alice in Chains
2013 short films
2013 films
2010s mockumentary films
Funny or Die
American mockumentary films
American comedy short films
Films about music and musicians
2010s English-language films
2010s American films